Riem Chbong Yeung is a 1972 Cambodian romance film directed by So Min Chiv and stars Kong Som Eun and Vichara Dany.

Soundtrack

References 
 

1972 films
Cambodian drama films
Khmer-language films
1970s romance films